Gábor Horváth (born 10 July 1983, in Tápiószecső) is a retired Hungarian footballer who played as a defender.

References
HLSZ 
Nemzeti Sport 

1983 births
Living people
People from Tápiószecső
Hungarian footballers
Association football defenders
BFC Siófok players
Tápiószecső FC footballers
Rákospalotai EAC footballers
Diósgyőri VTK players
Sportspeople from Pest County